Carrer de Pau Claris is a street in Eixample, Barcelona. It crosses the district grid perpendicularly to the seafront, between Passeig de Gràcia and Carrer de Roger de Llúria. It starts in Avinguda Diagonal and ends in Plaça Urquinaona, where it becomes Via Laietana. It's the second busiest one-way street in the Eixample district. 

It's named after the Catalan political leader Pau Claris i Casademunt, who proclaimed the Catalan Republic in 1641.

Transport

Metro
Urquinaona (L1, L4)
Passeig de Gràcia (L2, L3, L4)

See also
History of Barcelona
Ildefons Cerdà
List of streets and squares in Eixample

Streets in Barcelona
Eixample